Bluff is a 2022 independent neo-noir crime thriller film written, directed, filmed, edited and produced by Sheikh Shahnawaz. It tells the story of a London police officer who goes undercover as a heroin addict in a small English town and manipulates an unsuspecting local junkie into working with him for a dangerous drug dealer.

Plot
Detective Sergeant Daniel Miller is suspended from the London Metropolitan Police so that he can be secretly deployed to a small English town on an undercover assignment to uncover Britain's major suppliers of heroin and crack cocaine. He poses as a heroin addict and manipulates an unsuspecting junkie into working with him so that he can infiltrate the local drug network and work his way up the supply chain. The line between duty and criminality begins to blur as Miller's investigation becomes increasingly dangerous the closer he gets to finding the source of a drug trafficker.

Cast
 Gurj Gill as Miller / Danny
 Jason Adam as Cooks
 Nisaro Karim as Imran
 James Jaysen Bryhan as Collins
 Joe Egan as Neil

Production
Bluff was written, directed, filmed, edited and produced by Sheikh Shahnawaz as his feature directorial debut. Shahnawaz had finished writing the screenplay just 5 days before his father died. He went into production a month later to finish the film in honor of his father's memory. Shahnawaz was inspired by issues in his hometown:

This is a deeply personal film for me. Not only because of having to deal with my father's death while making it but also because it was set in my hometown and deals with homelessness and the illicit trade of heroin which is a prevalent issue here. I spent time with actual heroin users and drug dealers for research. The undercover policing tactics depicted in the film are based on real-life experiences of actual undercover police agents that operated in this region.

Sheikh produced Bluff for a final production budget of $2,000. He did this by filming completely guerilla as a one-man crew with locally-based actors in his hometown of Birmingham, England:

I was forced to make this film with only my own resources because as a 26-year-old filmmaker, a child of 2 Bangladeshi Muslim immigrants, from the inner-city of Birmingham, nobody in the UK film industry would give me a mainstream opportunity. Inspired by the debut micro-budget films of Christopher Nolan, Damien Chazelle, Barry Jenkins, Richard Linklater, Robert Rodriguez and Darren Aronofsky, I wasn’t going to let anything stop me from making this film.

The last 25% of the production was filmed after a 6-month hiatus in 2020 once COVID-19 lockdown measures had eased.

Release 
Bluff was released for digital download on 28 April 2022.

Reception 
On review aggregator Rotten Tomatoes, Bluff has an approval rating of 83% based on 6 reviews. Cath Clarke from The Guardian said: "It's not without flaws but Shahnawaz is clearly ambitious and does well on what looks like a minuscule budget". Michael Talbot-Haynes from Film Threat gave it a good review, writing: "The movie is an excellent opiate opera with fantastic performances by a needle-sharp cast".

References

External links
 

 
Official Instagram

2022 films
2022 crime thriller films
2022 independent films
British crime thriller films
British independent films
British neo-noir films
British nonlinear narrative films
2020s English-language films
2020s British films